Dos por uno is a Chilean telenovela starring Diego Muñoz, Carolina Varleta and Adela Secall originally aired on TVN and it premiered on March 11, 2013.

Plot

Cast
 Diego Muñoz as Ramiro Hernández / Valentina Infante/ Briggite Waters
 Carolina Varleta as Valentina Infante
 Mariana Loyola as Rita Casas
 Francisco Melo as Gonzalo Meyer - Villain
 Adela Secall as Alejandra Mardones
 María José Illanes as Adriana Ibarra - Villain
 Matías Oviedo as Pablo Saavedra
 Antonia Santa María as Angélica "Angy" Meyer
 Gloria Münchmeyer as Carlota Pinto
 Ximena Rivas as Silvia Villanueva
 José Martínez as Rodrigo Jorquera / Robert Jackson
 Loreto Valenzuela as Isidora Goycochea - Villain
 Hernán Contreras as Marcos Barrientos - Villain Principal
 Constanza Piccoli as Aurora Salinas
 Teresita Reyes as Lucy Santos
 Claudio Olate as Nelson Órdenes
 Belén Soto as Rafaela Hernández
 Giovanni Carella as Willy Casas
 Antonella Castagno as Daniela Hernández
 Valentina Vogel as Constanza Hernández

See also
 Televisión Nacional de Chile

External links
  Official website

2013 telenovelas
2013 Chilean television series debuts
2013 Chilean television series endings
Chilean telenovelas
Spanish-language telenovelas
Televisión Nacional de Chile telenovelas
Television shows set in Santiago